Clixtr Inc. was a startup company based in San Francisco, California.

Clixtr was a location-based service photo sharing platform which allows its users to create geo-tagged events and upload mobile photos to those events in real time. Multiple users are able to upload their photos to one event. Because Clixtr uses the iPhone GPS, Clixtr users create instant, location-aware, group photo albums which nearby users can contribute their own photos to.

References

 Clixtr Wins Social Networking Category at Emerging Tech Awards
 TechCrunch Clixtr Web Launch Announcement
 TechCrunch50 Launch Article
 VentureBeat Article about Clixtr Launch

Internet properties established in 2009
Companies based in San Francisco
Software companies based in California
Defunct software companies of the United States
2009 establishments in California